Brentham Football Club is a football club based in Brentham Garden Suburb, Ealing, West London. They are currently members of the Middlesex County League Premier Division and are affiliated to the Middlesex County Football Association.

History
Brentham were founded in February 1901, by a young man Henry Vivian in the Haven Arms in Ealing. The Brentham Institute, as it was originally called, was opened in 1911 and its Football Section formed eight years later. At the end of the 2002–03 season they resigned from the Southern Amateur League and joined Division Three of the Middlesex County League (MCFL). In the club's centenary season, Brentham were sitting on top of the MCFL, six points clear and with their first Premier Division title on the horizon, when Coronavirus intervened and the season ended prematurely in March 2020.

Ground
The club has played at the Brentham Club, Ealing since the club's formation in 1919.

Honours
Southern Amateur League 
Division Two champions: 1948–49, 1972–73

Southern Amateur League 
Division Three champions: 1986–87

Middlesex County League 
Division One West champions: 2015–16

References

Association football clubs established in 1919
Football clubs in England
Football clubs in London
Sport in the London Borough of Ealing
Middlesex County Football League